Séverine Beltrame and Laura Thorpe were the defending champions, having won the event in 2012, but both players chose not to defend their title.

Sandra Klemenschits and Andreja Klepač won the title, defeating Asia Muhammad and Allie Will in the final, 1–6, 6–4, [10–5].

Seeds

Draw

References 
 Draw

Open Feminin De Marseille - Doubles